Jean-Luc Tricoire (23 March 1953 – 23 June 2010) was a French sports shooter. He competed at the 1984 Summer Olympics, the 1988 Summer Olympics and the 1992 Summer Olympics.

References

External links
 

1953 births
2010 deaths
French male sport shooters
Olympic shooters of France
Shooters at the 1984 Summer Olympics
Shooters at the 1988 Summer Olympics
Shooters at the 1992 Summer Olympics
People from Châlons-en-Champagne
Sportspeople from Marne (department)
20th-century French people